The Scarapist is a 2015 American suspense thriller film written and directed by Jeanne Marie Spicuzza, with co-direction and editing by Synthian Sharp. The film is based on a true story of therapist abuse and related essay written by Spicuzza.

Plot
Lana (Jeanne Marie Spicuzza) a suburban writer, wife and mother, is seduced into bogus therapy by a possessed and demented hypnotherapist Ilse (Katy Colloton). Ilse employs the help of her patients, like Sweenie (R. Michael Gull). In a battle of good versus evil, Lana fights for her family against Ilse, who sets out to destroy them all.

Cast
 Jeanne Marie Spicuzza as Lana
 Katy Colloton as Ilse
 R. Michael Gull as Sweenie
 Kyle Walsh as Nathan
 Nathaniel Ross as Steve

Release 
The film had its world premiere at the LA Femme Film Festival in 2015. It was released in Landmark Theatres before coming to streaming services through distributor XVIII Entertainment.

A segment of the film score, The Dinner Party, is on permanent exhibition at the Brooklyn Museum.

Reception
The film has been hailed by critics David Luhrssen, Bennet Pomerantz and Tony Sokol as "intriguing" and "original."

Awards

See also 

 Get Out
 Hypnosis (2020 film)
 Hypnotic (2021 film)
 Teachers (2016 TV series)

References

External links 
 
 

2015 films
2015 thriller films
American thriller films
2010s English-language films
2010s American films